{{Infobox fraternity
| letters = 
| name = Iota Nu Delta
| crest = Iota Nu Delta Crest.png
| image_size = 200px
| alt = Iota Nu Delta Crest
| founded = 
| birthplace = Binghamton University
| affiliation = NAPA
| affiliation2 = NIC
| type = Social
| emphasis = Brotherhood Eternal

| scope = International
| mission = <div style="font-size:88%"> Iota Nu Delta uplifts its men in their duties: to serve, to lead, and to accomplish greater things in life. Bound by Brotherhood Eternal, we shall:Cultivate lifelong academic and professional excellence.Extend meaningful service to humanity and leadership in society.Promote understanding of the diverse South Asian cultures. </div>
| vision =
| motto = Is The Fire In You?  Imitated Never Duplicated
| maxim = Brotherhood Eternal  Shakti
| colors =  Orange and  Green
| symbol =
| free_label = Emblem
| free = Rose over Sword
| flower =
| jewel = Diamond
| publication = The ΙΝΔ Insider| chapters = 16 chapters & 15 Colonies
| members = 1000+
| address =
| city = New York
| state = NY
| ZIP code = 
| country = USA
| homepage = 
| footnotes =
}}

Iota Nu Delta (also IND) is the first South Asian interest college fraternity. IND was founded in 1994 at the Binghamton University. It is a member of the North American Interfraternity Conference since 2007 and National APIDA Panhellenic Association since 2016.

Founding
On February 7, 1994, eight male students at Binghamton University founded the first South-Asian Interest Greek Organization. Their stated goal in forming the organization was to bridge the gaps between people of different backgrounds, ethnicity, and cultures while promoting South Asian cultural awareness. Iota Nu Delta Fraternity, Inc. is South Asian based, but is not exclusive to men of South-Asian origin.

 Founding Fathers 

The first eight members, known as the national Founding Fathers, of Iota Nu Delta Fraternity, Inc. are:

Philanthropy

Iota Nu Delta has established mental health awareness and advocacy as its primary philanthropic focus and works in partnership with Active Minds.

Additionally, Iota Nu Delta supports bone marrow advocacy through the National Marrow Donor Program & SAMAR (South Asian Marrow Association of Recruiters). Iota Nu Delta is also involved with several other national non-profit organizations including the United Service Organizations, Association for India's Development, and SAALT (South Asian Americans Leading Together).

Chapters & Colonies
The chapters of Iota Nu Delta.  Active groups noted in bold, inactive groups noted in italics''.

Chapters
 Alpha - Binghamton University
 Beta - New York University
 Gamma - Drexel University
 Delta - State University of New York at Buffalo
 Epsilon - State University of New York at Stony Brook
 Zeta - University of Debrecen
 Eta - University of Maryland, College Park
 Theta - George Washington University and Georgetown University
 Iota - St. John's University
 Kappa - Temple University
 Lambda - Long Island University
 Mu - Rutgers University – New Brunswick Campus
 Xi - New York Institute of Technology - Old Westbury Campus
 Omicron - New York City chapter
 Pi - Pennsylvania State University
 Rho (P) - City College of New York
 Sigma - George Mason University

Colonies
 Hofstra University
 North Carolina State University
 Johns Hopkins University
 University of Pittsburgh
 The University of Texas at San Antonio
 The University of Texas at Austin
 East Carolina University
 Boston University
 New Jersey Institute of Technology
 Adelphi University
 Rutgers University-Newark
 University of Maryland-Baltimore County
Dallas Colony
Staten Island Colony

See also
List of social fraternities and sororities

References

External links

North American Interfraternity Conference
Fraternities and sororities in the United States
Binghamton University
1994 establishments in New York (state)
Asian-American fraternities and sororities
Student organizations established in 1994